Joel William Porter (born 25 December 1978) is a Australian former football (soccer) player.

Club career

Australia
Before joining Hartlepool United, Porter had previously played for Croydon Kings, West Adelaide, Melbourne Knights FC and Sydney Olympic. During his final season at Sydney Olympic Porter managed to score 6 goals in 19 starts, having played many of those matches as a midfielder.

Hartlepool United
Porter decided to look to Europe in a bid to find a club. Porter almost signed for Rayo Vallecano but the Spanish La Liga club were unprepared to take a gamble by signing him after doubts arouse over his fitness. After previously having trials in England with Wigan Athletic and Sunderland, before visa problems prevented them, Porter finally signed for Hartlepool, as manager Neale Cooper added the Aussie to his ranks.

Porter made his Hartlepool début against Swindon Town and scored his first goal against Burton Albion shortly afterwards during a live televised FA Cup match, victory which secured a third round tie at neighbours Sunderland. Hartlepool manager Neale Cooper decided to offer him an 18-month contract at the end of 2003. However, Porter struggled to score in his first season and only notched up 5 goals in 31 appearances. Porter's fifth goal for the club was perhaps one of the most important as it earned Hartlepool a draw in the first leg of the play-off semi-final against Bristol City. They lost the second leg 2-1.

During the following 2004/2005 season, Porter became a huge fan favourite and was a massive success. After a slow start he forced his way into the team after coming on as a substitute against Doncaster Rovers and scoring two late goals to secure a dramatic 3-2 win. This earned him a place alongside Adam Boyd in the Hartlepool line-up and the pair formed a legendary strike partnership. He then went on to notch 14 goals in 37 appearances. Porter's performances earned him the Fans' Player of the Year award. 

His performances attracted the attention of a host of Australian clubs such as Perth Glory and Wellington Phoenix FC who wanted to see him return home to play in the newly-formed A-League. Porter was closely linked to sign with the Phoenix, however Hartlepool elected to invoke the team option to re-sign him for one more year and he agreed to stay.

In the 2005/06 season, Porter struggled with a long-term knee injury that lasted 10 months and prevented him from playing for the majority of the season. Porter returned to Hartlepool squad and came on as a substitute against Huddersfield, scoring after 6 minutes to mark his return. However, his return could not prevent Hartlepool from being relegated from Football League One. He helped Hartlepool win promotion back to the Football League One the following season under Danny Wilson and helped Pools survive in the third tier the following two seasons. 

His final season at Victoria Park was his most prolific, scoring 23 times including a hat-trick against Swindon Town. In April, he announced he was heading back to Australia that summer but signed off his time in England in style, scoring twice at Yeovil, before being crowned the Player of the Year by fans and players alike before his last home game against Leeds United. 

He returned to the town in 2015 for the reunion of the club's 2005 play-off squad, making a surprise return on stage to the delight of the crowd in attendance, his shock appearance coming after a short video was played of him sending good wishes to his former team-mates for the night which he seemingly was unable to attend.

Gold Coast United
On 24 April 2009 Porter announced he was leaving Hartlepool United for Gold Coast United FC.

International career
Porter also represented Australia in the 2002 OFC Nations Cup where he went on to make four appearances for the Socceroos, scoring six goals in the process and finished as his country's top scorer. Porter was gifted the chance to play in the tournament as Soccer Australia could not afford to fund for its bigger overseas stars to play.

National team statistics

Honours

International
Australia
 OFC Nations Cup runners-up: 2004

Club
Hartlepool United
Football League Two runners-up: 2006–07

Individual
Hartlepool United Player of the Year: 2005
Hartlepool United Player of the Year: 2009

References

External links

 Gold Coast United profile
 OzFootball profile
 

1978 births
Living people
A-League Men players
Association football forwards
Australian soccer players
Soccer players from Adelaide
Australian expatriate soccer players
Australia international soccer players
National Premier Leagues players
National Soccer League (Australia) players
Croydon Kings players
Cumberland United FC players
Gold Coast United FC players
Hartlepool United F.C. players
Melbourne Knights FC players
Northern Demons SC players
Soccer players from Sydney
Sydney Olympic FC players
West Adelaide SC players
2002 OFC Nations Cup players